Grange Park Opera is a professional opera company and charity whose base is West Horsley Place in Surrey, England. Founded in 1998, the company staged an annual opera festival at The Grange, in Hampshire and in 2016–7, built a new opera house, the 'Theatre in the Woods', at West Horsley Place – the 350-acre estate inherited by author and broadcaster Bamber Gascoigne in 2014.

With five tiers of seating in a horseshoe shape (modelled on La Scala, Milan), the Theatre in the Woods is designed to target an optimum acoustic reverberation of 1.4 seconds.

Singers who have performed with Grange Park Opera include Bryn Terfel, Simon Keenlyside, Joseph Calleja, Claire Rutter, Rachel Nicholls, Bryan Register, Susan Gritton, Wynne Evans, Sally Matthews, Alfie Boe, Robert Poulton, Jeffrey Lloyd-Roberts, Sara Fulgoni, Clive Bayley and Alistair Miles. In recent years, the repertoire has included musicals: Fiddler on the Roof in 2015 and Oliver! in 2016. Fiddler on the Roof was subsequently staged in the Royal Albert Hall as part of the 2015 BBC Proms.

Grange Park Opera is a not-for-profit organisation. Its sister charity Pimlico Opera, founded in 1987, has staged co-productions with prisons since 1991 and taken more than 50,000 members of the public into prison. The Primary Robins project gives singing classes to 2,000 KS2 children a week in schools in deprived areas.

The 2020 season, including Puccini's La Bohème, Martin & Blane's Meet Me in St Louis, Ponchielli's La Gioconda, The Final Fling with The Royal Ballet and the world première of Anthony Bolton's The Life and Death of Alexander Litvinenko, was postponed because of the COVID-19 epidemic. Instead the company produced filmed versions of Maurice Ravel's L'heure espagnole and Benjamin Britten's Owen Wingrave. A new opera by Alex Woolf, The Feast in the Time of Plague, was created, and a number of other activities undertaken. The 2021 season opened with productions of Giuseppe Verdi' Falstaff, La Bohème, Nikolai Rimsky-Korsakov's The Maid of Pskov (in its second, four-act version and presented as Ivan the Terrible), and the postponed premiere of Bolton's Litvinenko opera. Because of COVID restrictions these were given before restricted audiences, and for some productions with recorded, rather than live, orchestra.

History 

In 1998, the newly created charity was party to a three-way lease with English Heritage, guardians of The Grange, Northington and the owners, the Baring family. For the first four seasons, performances took place in the Orangery, into which had been fitted raked seating (the seats themselves came from Covent Garden), stage and orchestra pit. For the 2002 season, the charity made significant changes to the auditorium which was expanded. Seating capacity was increased to 550 with two levels of seating.,

The festival was expanded to a five-week season of three operas in 2000, and to four operas in 2013.

In 2003, Grange Park Opera Hampshire season was extended to Nevill Holt, near Market Harborough in Leicestershire, where a 300-seat theatre was built in the stable courtyard. In 2012 Grange Park Opera handed the Leicestershire season to newly formed Nevill Holt Opera.

In March 2015, the Barings, unexpectedly, terminated the Hampshire lease and, searching for a new home, Grange Park Opera was offered the opportunity to build an opera house close to London at West Horsley Place near Guildford—the 350-acre Surrey estate inherited by author and broadcaster Bamber Gascoigne. Gascoigne placed his inheritance into a charity, the West Horsley Place Trust, which has granted Grange Park Opera a 99-year lease. Planning permission for a five-storey opera house, modelled on La Scala, was granted in May 2016 and Phase 1 building work commenced immediately. The opera house was ready in time for the long-scheduled production of Tosca starring Joseph Calleja which premiered on 8 June 2017. Phase 2 continued after the 2017 festival and including the exterior brickwork and a free-standing toilet building, the "Lavatorium Rotundum". Phase 3 included a colonnade whose columns are larch tree trunks.

Performance history
The company has staged both traditional and unexpected repertoire including: 
1998: Gala Opening included a performance by the Grimethorpe Colliery Band, Mozart Figaro's Wedding1999: Ravel L'heure espagnole, Poulenc Breasts of Tiresias, Grimethorpe Colliery Band
2000: Gilbert & Sullivan Mikado, Tchaikovsky Eugene Onegin, Handel Rinaldo2001: Mozart Cosi fan tutte, Bellini I Capuleti e i Montecchi, André Messager Fortunio2002: Verdi La Traviata, Cole Porter Anything Goes (with Kim Criswell and Graham Bickley), Britten Turn of the Screw2003: Puccini La bohème, Gilbert & Sullivan Iolanthe, Chabrier Le roi malgré lui2004: Rossini Cenerentola, Tchaikovsky The Enchantress, Bernstein Wonderful Town and at Nevill Holt Mozart Cosi fan tutte2005: Mozart Don Giovanni, Rodgers & Hammerstein South Pacific, Donizetti Maria Stuarda and at Nevill Holt Donizetti Elixir of Love2006: Mozart Le Nozze di Figaro, Massenet Thaïs, Donizetti Elixir of Love, Bruce Ford recital, and at Nevill Holt Rossini Barber of Seville2007: Mozart Magic Flute, Prokofiev The Gambler, Verdi Falstaff, a concert performance of Handel Semele, 10th anniversary celebration: London Symphony Orchestra, the Kings Singers, O Duo, Boy Blue, Kit & the Widow, and at Nevill Holt Bellini I Capuletti e I Montecchi (revival)
2008: Offenbach Blue Beard, Dvorak Rusalka, Puccini La fanciulla del West, Brideshead Revisited (film), Bryn Terfel recital, Prima ballerina Mara Galeazzi and friends from the Royal Ballet, and at Nevill Holt Verdi Falstaff (revival) and concert performances of Purcell Dido & Aeneas and Congreve Judgement of Paris2009: Cavalli Eliogabalo, Janacek The Cunning Little Vixen, Bellini Norma, a concert performance of Wagner Flying Dutchman, a night of revelries: Ray Davies of The Kinks, BalletBoyz, O Duo, Harry the Piano, Brahms sextet played by members of the London Symphony Orchestra, and at Nevill Holt Verdi Rigoletto2010: Puccini Tosca, Richard Strauss Capriccio, Prokofiev Love for Three Oranges, Jazz Evening with the Henry Armburg Jennings Band, and at Nevill Holt Puccini Madama Butterfly2011: Verdi Rigoletto, Dvorak Rusalka, Wagner Tristan & Isolde, Bryn Terfel, and at Nevill Holt Puccini Tosca2012: Puccini Madama Butterfly, Mozart Idomeneo, Tchaikovsky The Queen of Spades, 15th Birthday concert with Simon Keenlyside and the Bournemouth Symphony Orchestra, and at Nevill Holt Tchaikovsky Eugene Onegin2013: Poulenc Les Carmelites, Tchaikovsky Eugene Onegin, Bellini I puritani, Joseph Calleja and Messager Fortunio2014: Verdi La traviata, Britten Peter Grimes, Massenet Don Quichotte, and Tchaikovsky Queen of Spades (revival)
2015: Stein Fiddler on the Roof, Puccini La Boheme, Saint-Saëns Samson et Dalila, Tchaikovsky Eugene Onegin (revival)
2016: Bart Oliver!, Puccini La fanciulla del West (revival), Verdi Don Carlo, a concert performance of Wagner Tristan & Isolde
2017: Janáček Jenufa, Wagner Die Walküre, Puccini Tosca, an evening with Bryn Terfel and Zenaida Yanowsky
2018: Verdi's Un ballo in maschera, Rodgers & Hammerstein's Oklahoma!, Charles Gounod's Romeo et Juliette2019: Verdi's Don Carlo, Humperdinck's Hansel & Gretel, Gershwin's Porgy & Bess. An evening with Joyce DiDonato and a jazz evening with Simon Keenlyside.
2020: The following works were programmed, but due to the COVID-19 epidemic, were cancelled or postponed
Ponchielli's La Gioconda 
Puccini's La Bohème 
Meet Me in St Louis by Hugh Martin & Ralph Blane 
The world premiere of The Life and Death of Alexander Litvinenko with music by Anthony Bolton and libretto by Kit Hesketh-Harvey.
"Ballet in the Woods": guest artists from The Royal Ballet. In the 2020–2021 season Grange Park undertook filmed versions of Maurice Ravel's L'heure espagnole and Benjamin Britten's Owen Wingrave. 
2021:  Verdi's Falstaff, Puccini's La bohème, Rimsky-Korsakov's Ivan the Terrible (a conflation of his two operas The Noblewoman Vera Sheloga and The Maid of Pskov), the world premiere of The Life and Death of Alexander Litvinenko with music by Anthony Bolton and libretto by Kit Hesketh-Harvey. 
2022: Verdi's Otello, Ponchielli's La Gioconda, Janacek's The Excursions of Mr Broucek, Wagner's Der Fliegende Holländer. The Final Fling, a double piano recital with Pavel Kolesnikov and Samson Tsoy. 
The 2023 season features three great love stories and a Welsh knight. Wagner's Tristan und Isolde, Puccini's Tosca, Massenet's Werther. An evening with Bryn Terfel.

Under-36s schemes
The Under 36 scheme is open to opera fans aged between 18 and 36. Those under 36 can apply for tickets on all dates at a flat rate of £36 per ticket.
The "Musical Chairs" scheme is open to young people aged 14 – 25 who otherwise could not come to the opera.

See also
List of opera festivals
Country house opera
Country House Theatres

References
Notes

Further reading
Christiansen, Rupert, "Ugly opera, winning performance", The Daily Telegraph, 6 June 2007. Retrieved 2 June 2008.
Sutcliff, Tom, "To the manor sung", Evening Standard, 1 June 2001. Retrieved via subscription 2 June 2008.
Topping, G., "What Wasfi did next", Oxford Today'', Volume 18 Number 3, June 2006. Retrieved 2 June 2008
Under 35s schemes. Retrieved 5 January 2012

Sources
Grange Park: The Spaced Season 2021 (2021), Grange Park Programme book.

External links
Grange Park Opera website
Grange Park Opera official channel on YouTube

British opera companies
Opera festivals
Music festivals in Hampshire
Musical groups established in 1998
Opera houses in England